Artichoke Joe's Casino is a card club in San Bruno, California. The club is owned by Dennis Sammut and managed, in part, by Ron Cox, a former Foster City councilman.

History
The establishment was a family founded and family owned business since 1916. The one-room Joe's Pool Parlor switched names to Artichoke Joe's in 1921, becoming a permanent fixture in San Bruno sporting life. Joseph Sammut opened his pool parlor and phone exchange in Al LoReaux's former plumbing shop. Most calls concerned horse races. Joe accepted any wager, no matter how large. Asked how he would pay off if he lost a big bet, he replied, "In artichoke leaves," hence the name. Still owned by the Sammut family, Artichoke Joe's is one of the city's oldest businesses.

The casino came to fame in the 1990s during construction of the SFO BART extension because the owner spent hundreds of thousands of dollars in an attempt to both derail the extension entirely and to profit from it.

References

External links

official website

San Bruno, California
Casinos completed in 1916
1916 establishments in California
Casinos in California
History of the San Francisco Bay Area
Bay Area Rapid Transit